Renganaath Ravee is an Indian sound designer, sound editor and documentary filmmaker

Biography
Renganaath Ravee is an Indian sound designer/ supervising sound editor based in Mumbai who has worked in over 100 plus feature films (extending to eleven languages including English, Hindi, Malayalam, Tamil, Telugu, Ladakhi, Marathi, Nepali, Arabic, Portuguese and Kannada), documentaries, short films, advertisements, and installations. He has won the Kerala State Film Awards for Best Sound Designer in the year 2015, 2017 & 2021 .The poetry installation, an amalgamation of poetry, sculpture and sound has earned him a place in the Limca Book of Records for being the first of its kind in the history of art. He has interpreted more than ten poems with sound of eminent poets across the globe.

	Renganaath started his career as a sound recordist at K. J. Yesudas Tharangini Records Studios. To pursue his passion, he moved to Bollywood in 2006 for more opportunities where he worked as a sound editor with renowned sound designers like Vivek Sachidanand, P.Balaram, Dwarak Warrier and Academy Award winner Resul Pookutty. It was in 2010, he made his debut as a sound designer in Mollywood for the film Nayakan, directed by Lijo Jose Pellissery.

	 Renganaath is a visiting faculty at various noted film schools and an interim interview board member at the prestigious K. R. Narayanan National Institute of Visual Science and Arts, Kottayam. Renganaath directed his first documentary "Daveli... a Tale Song", a vanishing folk art which were popular in central Kerala.

Accolades

Filmography

Director, Writer, Producer

Sound Editor/Designer

Feature films

Short films

Documentaries

Corporate Films

Other

External links

 
 
Sound designer Renganaath Ravee is making his work heard in tinsel town at The Hindu
Interview: Renganaath Ravee
New sound in tinseltown at The New Indian Express
The first ever poetry installation
ശബ്ദ പരീക്ഷണങ്ങൾക്ക് നല്ലത് മോളിവുഡ്: രംഗനാഥ് രവി...
Poetry Installation Season 2
State award winner Renganath Ravee pats Pellissery...
Renganaath Ravee’s resounding success in cinema at The Hindu
Renganaath Ravee on creating the path-breaking soundscape in ‘Jallikattu’  at The Hindu
Interview of Renganaath Ravee Sound Designer with Prashant Pillai | Sound of Jallikattu
ജല്ലിക്കെട്ടിലെ ശബ്ദം വന്ന വഴികളെ കുറിച്ച് രംഗനാഥ് രവി
The Renganaath Ravee Interview: ‘Background Music Should Not Be Used To Eliminate Silence In Films’ 
ടെക്നീഷ്യൻസിന്റെ തുച്ഛമായ ശമ്പളത്തിൽ നിന്നും ഇനി എന്താണ് കുറയ്ക്കേണ്ടത് ?
ആടി വാ കാറ്റേ... പാടി വാ കാറ്റേ' ജോൺസൺ മാസ്റ്റർക്ക് ഗിറ്റാറിൽ ആദരവുമായി സൗണ്ട് ഡിസൈനർ രംഗനാഥ് രവി
Outstanding Achievement in Sound Editing – Foreign Language Feature at The Hollywood Reporter
ഗോൾഡൻ റീൽ പുരസ്കാരത്തിന് രംഗനാഥ് രവിയും ജല്ലിക്കട്ടും
Jallikattu has been nominated for the prestigious Motion Picture Sound Editors (MPSE) Golden Reel Awards at The New Indian Express
15-ാമത് ബുസാൻ ചലച്ചിത്ര പുരസ്‌കാര നോമിനേഷനുകളിൽ ഇടം നേടി ചുരുളി. മികച്ച പ്രൊഡക്ഷൻ ഡിസൈൻ, ശബ്ദം തുടങ്ങിയ വിഭാഗങ്ങളിലേക്കാണ് തിരഞ്ഞെടുത്തിട്ടുള്ളത്
Gokuldas has been nominated for Best Production Design while Renganaath Ravee has been nominated for Best Sound
Churuli nominated for 15th Asian Film Awards, Gokuldas and Renganaath Ravee were nominated for the Best Production Design and Best Sound categories, respectively

References

1981 births
Living people
Indian sound designers
Indian sound editors
Indian documentary filmmakers